ESIS may refer to:
 Element Structure Information Set
 European Space Information System
 European chemical Substances Information System